Lieutenant-General Sir Neil Douglas  (1779 – 1 September 1853) was a British Army officer who fought at the 1815 Battle of Waterloo and later became Commander-in-Chief, Scotland.

Life
He was born in Glasgow the fifth son of John Douglas a merchant and descendant of the Earls of Angus.

Douglas was commissioned as a Second Lieutenant into the 95th Regiment of Foot on 28 January 1801. Promoted to captain in the 79th Regiment of Foot on 19 April 1804, he took part in the Battle of Copenhagen in August 1807, the Battle of Corunna in January 1809 and Battle of Bussaco in September 1810 during the Napoleonic Wars. In the last he was almost killed, being found on the battlefield with seven bayonet wounds but nevertheless surviving.

In May 1813 he took command of the whole regiment in place of Lt Col Fulton. At the Battle of the Pyrenees he had his horse shot out from under him.

He went on to fight in the Battle of Nivelle in November 1813, the Battle of the Nive in December 1813 and the Battle of Toulouse in April 1814. Promoted to lieutenant-colonel on 3 December 1812, he commanded his regiment at the Battle of Quatre Bras in June 1815 and the Battle of Waterloo also in June 1815 during the Hundred Days.

He served as Commander-in-Chief, Scotland and also as Governor of Edinburgh Castle from 1842 to 1847 at the rank of Major General.

He died during a trip to Brussels on 1 September 1853.

Family 
In 1816 he married Barbara Robertson, daughter of George Robertson, a banker in Greenock. They had a son, General Sir John Douglas of Glenfinart GCB (7 July 1817 – 8 September 1888), a British Army officer who became Commander-in-Chief, Scotland.

References

 

|-

|-

|-

|-

|-

British Army lieutenant generals
1779 births
1853 deaths
Knights Commander of the Order of the Bath
Recipients of the Order of St. Vladimir, 4th class
Recipients of the Waterloo Medal
Knights Cross of the Military Order of Maria Theresa
Rifle Brigade officers
Queen's Own Cameron Highlanders officers
British Army personnel of the Napoleonic Wars
British Army personnel of the Peninsular War
Military personnel from Glasgow